Christensen Canadian African Lines (CCAL) was a Norwegian cargo shipping company that traded between Canada and Africa between 1948 and 2000.

History
Consul Lars Christensen founded the company in 1948 after a suggestion by his friend Alfred Clegg of Kerr Steamship as a liner service provider between east coast of Canada and South Africa. CCAL aimed to compete with the British Elder Dempster Lines of Liverpool, which operated a liner service between South Africa and Atlantic North America via West Africa. The first year of operation showed a loss, which was however soon recovered in the following years.

The company, which was initially named Christensen Canadian South African Lines (CCSAL), was owned and operated by Lars Christensen's A/S Thor Dahl shipping company and appointed Kerr Steamship to providing the agency network in North America and Africa.

In 1951 Holland Africa line was appointed to operate the agencies in Africa. Kerr remained as agent for Canada only.

As traffic grew, it was decided to supplement the Burntisland vessels with larger and faster ships. Thor Dahl contracted three vessels of about 8000 tons deadweight in Bergen:  delivered in 1952,  delivered in 1954 and  delivered in 1955. Thorsisle was transferred to Pacific Islands Transport Line after delivery of MV Thorsgaard.

The main export cargo from Canada was newsprint, printing paper and other forest products. The bulk of this cargo from Canada was produced in areas far from Montreal and it was necessary for the vessels to call at other ports in the Gulf of Saint Lawrence and Saint Lawrence River to load paper. Calls were also made at such ports as Corner Brook, Newfoundland, Baie-Comeau, Port-Alfred and Trois-Rivières in Quebec. The St. Lawrence Seaway in those days could only accommodate vessels of up to about 3,000 DWT what meant that not all CCSAL vessels could make a call to this port as they had a greater deadweight tonnage. In Africa ports in South Africa, Mozambique and later Tanzania and Kenya were called. With further growth of the traffic, calls to Mombasa, Tanga and Dar es Salaam in East Africa were added and the company name changed into Christensen Canadian African Lines (CCAL). CCAL also started to call at some West African ports.

Thor Dahl then contracted a new trio at their own Framnaes shipyard in Sandefjord which were faster and close to 9,000 DWT:  delivered in 1958,  delivered in 1959 and  delivered in 1960.

Early in 1960 negotiations were opened between the South African Citrus Exchange in Pretoria and CCAL to carry oranges from Cape Town to Montreal. Due to this contract, the company began to equip vessels with simple means of cooling that was not installed before. Later, when the vessels had sophisticated cooling chambers installed with the required ventilation, boxes as packaging were replaced with cartons.

CCAL had then even larger vessels built at Framnaes.  was operated from 1968 until she was sold in 1983, having by then made 62 round trips for the line.

Due to the decrease of cargo in the early to middle 1980's, it was decided that CCAL would no longer serve East Africa on a regular basis and that the vessels would turn around at Durban, or often Richard's Bay. When the Canadian government decided to join international sanctions against South Africa the import of agricultural products from South Africa to Canada was lost. In order to compensate for this, a call to ports in Portugal was added, causing an increased transit time between Cape Town and Montreal of about nine days. The cargo shipped consisted mainly of container traffic, with a small amount of general cargo. A further growth of the traffic between South Africa and Canada was caused by the departure of CCAL's competitor Fednav Group from the market due to the sanctions against South Africa. Later CCAL dropped the Portugal call as the cargo loaded was heavy weighting causing a too deep draft for the port of Montreal which resulted in discharging some cargo Quebec City already what made this traffic unprofitable.

Additionally they could carry 400 TEU of containers. These two vessels were the last new ships for A/S Thor Dahl and left the trade in the late 1990s due to increased maintenance costs and because the engines were not as fuel-efficient as in more modern vessels.

On 31 August 2000 a deal was closed between A/S Thor Dahl and CP Ships allowing CP to buy Christensen Canadian African Lines (CCAL). CCAL operated at this time a 21-day multi-purpose service between Eastern Canada, Great Lakes and South Africa, using three "Astrakhan" type vessels. CCAL had provided uninterrupted service for more than 50 years. CP Ships integrated CCAL into its Americana Ships division and merged it into the Lykes Lines brand. TUI AG bought CP and merged in 2006 in Hapag-Lloyd.

International identifiers
BIC Codes (Container prefixes): CACU

Ships

See also
CP Ships
Hapag-Lloyd

Notes

 Bureau International des Containers (Container prefix codes, now linking CCAL units to Hapag-Lloyd due to the merger)
 http://thor-dahl.lardex.net/
 http://iancoombe.tripod.com/id35.html

External links
Maritime Timetable images (Collection of old company brochures)

Defunct shipping companies of Norway
Transport companies established in 1948
Transport companies disestablished in 2000
Norwegian companies established in 1948
2000 disestablishments in Norway